Harlow District Council is the elected body responsible for the governance of Harlow, Essex. Its jurisdiction covers a non-metropolitan district, established under the Local Government Act 1972. Originally there were 42 Councillors, but following boundary changes this was reduced to 33, with 3 councillors returned from 11 wards.

Elections

Since the first election to the council in 1973 political control of the council has been held by the following parties:

References

Non-metropolitan district councils of England
Local authorities in Essex
Billing authorities in England
District Council